The Mount Remarkable District Council is a local government area located between the top of the Spencer Gulf and the base of the Southern Flinders Ranges in South Australia. The district encompasses a wide variety of towns, including coastal ports and agricultural centres. The economy of the district council is largely based on agriculture.

History
The Flinders Ranges region has been one of the first areas settled by pioneers, with the land being used mainly for extensive sheep grazing and sporadic mining. Most of the rural land is held under perpetual and pastoral leases.

The District Council of Mount Remarkable was formed when the District Council of Port Germein and District Council of Wilmington areas merged in 1980. The council is named after the nearby peak of Mount Remarkable, named by Edward John Eyre in 1840, in reference to the way it stood out against the surrounding landscape.

Economy
Agriculture is the major facet of the economy, represented by a mixture of grazing, cropping, mixed farming, horticulture and forestry.

The region is rich in minerals and the potential value of new mining development is considerable and currently being explored.

Tourism also plays a part in the economy, with the coast and the Southern Flinders Ranges attracting tourists.

Localities

The district includes the following localities – Amyton, Bangor, Baroota, Booleroo Centre, Hammond, Mambray Creek, Melrose, Murray Town, Nectar Brook, Port Germein, Telowie, Weeroona Island, Willowie, Wirrabara and Wongyarra, and part of Appila, Bruce, Coomooroo, Germein Bay, Moockra, Morchard, Saltia, Stone Hut, Wilmington, Winninowie and Woolundunga.

Council

Chairmen and mayors of Mount Remarkable

 Noel William Schmidt (1980–1983)
 Eric Graham Hillam (1983-1984)
 Reginald Colin Zwar (1984-1985)
 Trevor Clarence Roocke (1983-2010)
 Sandra Wauchope (2010–2016)
 Colin Nottle (2016–2018)
Phillip Heaslip (2018 to Present)

References

External links
District Council of Mount Remarkable

Mount Remarkable